This is a list of flags of Macau.

Official Flag

Prefecture

Historical Flags

Governor of Macau

Proposed flags

References

Macanese
History of Macau
Flags